Dilj is a low mountain in south-central Slavonia, located in eastern Croatia. Of all the mountains in Slavonia, Dilj is the lowest-lying, at 471 meters. It is located north of Slavonski Brod and south of Krndija. Dilj mountain contains a forest that spreads in an east–west direction of approximately 50 km, and a north–south direction of approximately 30 km. Forestation of the area includes a variety of plants, including Pannonian-Balkan forest oak. Areas not covered in forestation are mainly cultivated with Orchards, Vineyards and Dehesas.

References 

Mountains of Croatia
Slavonia
Slavonski Brod
Hills of Croatia
Pannonian island mountains